All About Love is a 2005 Hong Kong romance film directed by Daniel Yu Wai-Kwok starring Andy Lau, Charlie Yeung and Charlene Choi.

Plot summary
Ko (Andy Lau) is a hard working doctor who has little time to spend with his wife (Charlene Choi). When she dies in a car accident her heart is given to another woman, Tse Yuen Sam (Charlie Yeung). Ko later  changes careers and becomes a paramedic. One night while on call in an ambulance, Ko attends a traffic accident involving Sam. He discovers she is the recipient of his wife's heart and that her husband Derek (also played by Lau) has left her. Ko decides to use their resemblance as a means of making amends for both his and Derek's treatment of their wives.

Cast
Ko/Derek: Andy Lau
Tse Yuen Sam: Charlie Yeung
Zi Qing: Charlene Choi
Ko's colleague: Lam Suet
Ko's father: Benz Hui
Heart surgeon: Anthony Wong
Sasha Hou
Andrew Lin
Gigi Wong 
Joe Cheung

See also
 List of Hong Kong films

References

External links
 All About Love at www.lovehkfilm.com 
 

2005 films
Hong Kong romantic drama films
2000s Cantonese-language films
2005 romantic drama films
2000s Hong Kong films